{
Chuchmany – a small village (selo) in Zolochiv Raion, Lviv (province) of Western Ukraine. It belongs to Busk urban hromada, one of the hromadas of Ukraine.

About 297 people currently live in the village and local government is administered by the Humnyska village council.

Geography 

History and Religion 
The earliest known written mention dates back to 1476, but traces exist of Stone Age settlement (third millennium BC). Archaeological excavations revealed these near the villages of  Chuchmany and Humnyska.

Christians of Chuchmany belong to the parish of Humnyska.

Until 18 July 2020, Chuchmany belonged to Busk Raion. The raion was abolished in July 2020 as part of the administrative reform of Ukraine, which reduced the number of raions in Lviv Oblast to seven. The area of Busk Raion was merged into Zolochiv Raion.

References

External links 
 Історія християнства в Бузькому районі Львівської області 
 weather.in.ua

Villages in Zolochiv Raion, Lviv Oblast